Fire Song is a 2015 Canadian drama film, written and directed by Adam Garnet Jones.

Plot
The film stars Andrew Martin as Shane, a bisexual aboriginal teenager. When his sister, Destiny,  commits suicide just weeks before he is scheduled to leave his community to attend university, he is forced to wrestle with the decision of whether to follow his dreams or stay home to help support his family.

Screenings and awards
The film premiered at the 2015 Toronto International Film Festival, and was screened as the closing night gala at the 2015 ImagineNATIVE Film + Media Arts Festival, where it won the Air Canada Audience Choice award. It also received the audience choice award for Best Narrative Feature at the Reelout Queer Film Festival, where it was featured as the opening gala in 2016, and was named both Best Film and Best Canadian Film at the Queer North Film Festival in 2016.

Cast

See also
List of lesbian, gay, bisexual or transgender-related films of 2015

References

External links 
 

2015 films
2010s coming-of-age drama films
Canadian LGBT-related films
LGBT-related drama films
2015 LGBT-related films
First Nations films
Canadian coming-of-age drama films
English-language Canadian films
LGBT First Nations culture
Films directed by Adam Garnet Jones
Male bisexuality in film
2015 directorial debut films
2010s English-language films
2010s Canadian films